Moses Omote Ugbisien (born 11 December 1964) is a Nigerian athlete who competed mainly in the 400 metres.

Ugbisien is from the Delta State in Nigeria and is of Yoruban ancestry.

He competed for Nigeria in the 1984 Summer Olympics held in Los Angeles, United States in the 4 x 400 metre relay where he won the bronze medal with his teammates Sunday Uti, Rotimi Peters and Innocent Egbunike.

He also competed for Nigeria in the 1988 Summer Olympics in Seoul, South Korea.

External links
 Sports Reference

1964 births
Living people
Nigerian male sprinters
Olympic bronze medalists for Nigeria
Athletes (track and field) at the 1984 Summer Olympics
Athletes (track and field) at the 1988 Summer Olympics
Olympic athletes of Nigeria
Medalists at the 1984 Summer Olympics
Olympic bronze medalists in athletics (track and field)
African Games gold medalists for Nigeria
African Games medalists in athletics (track and field)
African Games bronze medalists for Nigeria
Athletes (track and field) at the 1987 All-Africa Games
Universiade silver medalists for Nigeria
Universiade medalists in athletics (track and field)
20th-century Nigerian people